The 1946–47 New York Rangers season was the franchise's 21st season. The Rangers compiled a 22–32–6 record in the regular season and finished with 50 points. The team's fifth-place finish caused it to miss the NHL playoffs.

Regular season

Final standings

Record vs. opponents

Schedule and results

|- align="center" bgcolor="#FFBBBB"
| 1 || 17 || @ Montreal Canadiens || 3–0 || 0–1–0
|- align="center" bgcolor="#CCFFCC"
| 2 || 20 || @ Detroit Red Wings || 3–1 || 1–1–0
|- align="center" bgcolor="#CCFFCC"
| 3 || 23 || @ Montreal Canadiens || 4–1 || 2–1–0
|- align="center" bgcolor="#FFBBBB"
| 4 || 26 || @ Boston Bruins || 3–1 || 2–2–0
|- align="center" bgcolor="white"
| 5 || 30 || Boston Bruins || 3–3 || 2–2–1
|-

|- align="center" bgcolor="#CCFFCC"
| 6 || 2 || Detroit Red Wings || 7–4 || 3–2–1
|- align="center" bgcolor="#FFBBBB"
| 7 || 3 || @ Detroit Red Wings || 3–1 || 3–3–1
|- align="center" bgcolor="#FFBBBB"
| 8 || 6 || @ Chicago Black Hawks || 6–2 || 3–4–1
|- align="center" bgcolor="#FFBBBB"
| 9 || 9 || @ Toronto Maple Leafs || 4–2 || 3–5–1
|- align="center" bgcolor="#FFBBBB"
| 10 || 10 || Boston Bruins || 4–0 || 3–6–1
|- align="center" bgcolor="white"
| 11 || 13 || Montreal Canadiens || 4–4 || 3–6–2
|- align="center" bgcolor="#FFBBBB"
| 12 || 16 || Chicago Black Hawks || 6–2 || 3–7–2
|- align="center" bgcolor="#FFBBBB"
| 13 || 17 || Toronto Maple Leafs || 5–4 || 3–8–2
|- align="center" bgcolor="#FFBBBB"
| 14 || 21 || @ Detroit Red Wings || 3–1 || 3–9–2
|- align="center" bgcolor="#CCFFCC"
| 15 || 23 || @ Montreal Canadiens || 3–2 || 4–9–2
|- align="center" bgcolor="#CCFFCC"
| 16 || 24 || @ Chicago Black Hawks || 5–1 || 5–9–2
|- align="center" bgcolor="#FFBBBB"
| 17 || 27 || @ Boston Bruins || 5–2 || 5–10–2
|-

|- align="center" bgcolor="#CCFFCC"
| 18 || 1 || @ Chicago Black Hawks || 2–1 || 6–10–2
|- align="center" bgcolor="#CCFFCC"
| 19 || 4 || Montreal Canadiens || 2–1 || 7–10–2
|- align="center" bgcolor="#CCFFCC"
| 20 || 8 || @ Boston Bruins || 6–4 || 8–10–2
|- align="center" bgcolor="white"
| 21 || 11 || Detroit Red Wings || 1–1 || 8–10–3
|- align="center" bgcolor="#FFBBBB"
| 22 || 14 || @ Toronto Maple Leafs || 3–2 || 8–11–3
|- align="center" bgcolor="#FFBBBB"
| 23 || 15 || Montreal Canadiens || 5–3 || 8–12–3
|- align="center" bgcolor="#FFBBBB"
| 24 || 18 || @ Boston Bruins || 3–2 || 8–13–3
|- align="center" bgcolor="#FFBBBB"
| 25 || 22 || Toronto Maple Leafs || 3–1 || 8–14–3
|- align="center" bgcolor="#CCFFCC"
| 26 || 25 || Montreal Canadiens || 2–0 || 9–14–3
|- align="center" bgcolor="white"
| 27 || 28 || @ Detroit Red Wings || 2–2 || 9–14–4
|- align="center" bgcolor="white"
| 28 || 29 || Boston Bruins || 2–2 || 9–14–5
|- align="center" bgcolor="#FFBBBB"
| 29 || 31 || Detroit Red Wings || 5–4 || 9–15–5
|-

|- align="center" bgcolor="#FFBBBB"
| 30 || 1 || @ Boston Bruins || 3–1 || 9–16–5
|- align="center" bgcolor="#FFBBBB"
| 31 || 2 || Toronto Maple Leafs || 5–4 || 9–17–5
|- align="center" bgcolor="#CCFFCC"
| 32 || 4 || @ Toronto Maple Leafs || 2–0 || 10–17–5
|- align="center" bgcolor="#CCFFCC"
| 33 || 5 || Chicago Black Hawks || 9–0 || 11–17–5
|- align="center" bgcolor="#FFBBBB"
| 34 || 8 || Boston Bruins || 3–1 || 11–18–5
|- align="center" bgcolor="#CCFFCC"
| 35 || 12 || Toronto Maple Leafs || 3–2 || 12–18–5
|- align="center" bgcolor="#CCFFCC"
| 36 || 15 || Detroit Red Wings || 4–3 || 13–18–5
|- align="center" bgcolor="#FFBBBB"
| 37 || 18 || @ Montreal Canadiens || 6–2 || 13–19–5
|- align="center" bgcolor="#CCFFCC"
| 38 || 19 || Chicago Black Hawks || 5–3 || 14–19–5
|- align="center" bgcolor="#CCFFCC"
| 39 || 22 || @ Chicago Black Hawks || 4–2 || 15–19–5
|- align="center" bgcolor="#CCFFCC"
| 40 || 25 || @ Toronto Maple Leafs || 1–0 || 16–19–5
|-

|- align="center" bgcolor="#FFBBBB"
| 41 || 1 || @ Montreal Canadiens || 2–1 || 16–20–5
|- align="center" bgcolor="#CCFFCC"
| 42 || 2 || Montreal Canadiens || 7–1 || 17–20–5
|- align="center" bgcolor="#CCFFCC"
| 43 || 5 || @ Chicago Black Hawks || 3–2 || 18–20–5
|- align="center" bgcolor="#FFBBBB"
| 44 || 9 || @ Detroit Red Wings || 5–2 || 18–21–5
|- align="center" bgcolor="#FFBBBB"
| 45 || 12 || @ Boston Bruins || 10–1 || 18–22–5
|- align="center" bgcolor="#CCFFCC"
| 46 || 16 || Toronto Maple Leafs || 6–2 || 19–22–5
|- align="center" bgcolor="#CCFFCC"
| 47 || 19 || Boston Bruins || 6–0 || 20–22–5
|- align="center" bgcolor="#FFBBBB"
| 48 || 22 || @ Toronto Maple Leafs || 2–0 || 20–23–5
|- align="center" bgcolor="white"
| 49 || 23 || Detroit Red Wings || 2–2 || 20–23–6
|- align="center" bgcolor="#FFBBBB"
| 50 || 26 || Chicago Black Hawks || 9–7 || 20–24–6
|-

|- align="center" bgcolor="#FFBBBB"
| 51 || 2 || Boston Bruins || 3–2 || 20–25–6
|- align="center" bgcolor="#FFBBBB"
| 52 || 3 || Chicago Black Hawks || 9–4 || 20–26–6
|- align="center" bgcolor="#CCFFCC"
| 53 || 5 || @ Chicago Black Hawks || 3–1 || 21–26–6
|- align="center" bgcolor="#FFBBBB"
| 54 || 9 || Toronto Maple Leafs || 4–2 || 21–27–6
|- align="center" bgcolor="#FFBBBB"
| 55 || 12 || Detroit Red Wings || 4–2 || 21–28–6
|- align="center" bgcolor="#FFBBBB"
| 56 || 15 || @ Montreal Canadiens || 1–0 || 21–29–6
|- align="center" bgcolor="#FFBBBB"
| 57 || 16 || Montreal Canadiens || 4–3 || 21–30–6
|- align="center" bgcolor="#FFBBBB"
| 58 || 19 || @ Detroit Red Wings || 2–0 || 21–31–6
|- align="center" bgcolor="#FFBBBB"
| 59 || 22 || @ Toronto Maple Leafs || 5–3 || 21–32–6
|- align="center" bgcolor="#CCFFCC"
| 60 || 23 || Chicago Black Hawks || 4–3 || 22–32–6
|-

Playoffs
The Rangers failed to qualify for the Stanley Cup playoffs for the fifth consecutive season.

Player statistics
Skaters

Goaltenders

†Denotes player spent time with another team before joining Rangers. Stats reflect time with Rangers only.
‡Traded mid-season. Stats reflect time with Rangers only.

Awards and records

Transactions

See also
1946–47 NHL season

References

New York Rangers seasons
New York Rangers
New York Rangers
New York Rangers
New York Rangers
Madison Square Garden
1940s in Manhattan